Banseli is a village in Ajmer tehsil of Ajmer district of Rajasthan state in India.The village falls under Deo nagar gram panchayat.

Demography 
As per 2011 census of India, Banseli has population of 3,375 of which 1,792 are males and 1,583 are females. Sex ratio of the village is 883.

Transportation
Banseli is connected by air (Kishangarh Airport), by train (Pushkar Terminus railway station, Budha Pushkar Halt railway station) and by road.

See also
Ajmer Tehsil
Pushkar Terminus railway station
Budha Pushkar Halt railway station

References

Villages in Ajmer district